The Martinet dioxindole synthesis was first reported in 1913 by J. Martinet. It is a chemical reaction in which a primary or secondary aniline or substituted aromatic amine is condensed with ethyl or methyl ester of mesoxalic acid to make a dioxindole  in the absence of oxygen.

Proposed mechanism

In the first step, the amino group on the aniline (1) attacks the carbonyl of the ethyl oxomalonate (2). A proton from the nitrogen is extracted by the oxygen and an alcohol group forms (3). The carbonyl re-forms to make a keto group and an ethanol molecule leaves (4). Next, a ring closing reaction occurs by the bond from the aromatic benzene ring attacking the partially positive carbonyl to form a five-member ring (5). After a proton transfer (6), an isomerization or a [1,3] hydride shift occurs and aromaticity is restored to the six-membered ring (7). In the presence of base, the ester is hydrolyzed, ethanol is lost (8) and a decarboxylation occurs (9). The resulting product is the desired dioxindole (10).

In the presence of oxygen, dioxindole converts to isatin through oxidation.

Applications

The Martinet dioxindole synthesis is utilized in the preparation of oxindole derivatives. Oxindole derivatives found in natural products are gaining popularity in research because of their structural diversity. 3-substituted-3-hydroxy-2-oxindole is the central structure of a wide variety of biologically important compounds found in natural products. The 3-substituted-3-hydroxy-2-oxindole structure holds anti-oxidant, anti-cancer, anti-HIV, and neuroprotective properties. The utilization of this core structure for drug synthesis and the relevant cellular pathways involved are being extensively studied. The enantio-selective addition of 3-substituted oxindole derivatives to different electrophiles gives access to chiral 3,3-disubstituted oxindole derivatives. The dioxindole is a strong nucleophile for the Michael addition of dioxindoles to nitroalkenes in order to obtain 3,3-disubstituted oxindole derivatives.

Experimental examples

The Martinet dioxindole synthesis proceeds with an alkoxyaniline, 3,4,5-trimethoxyaniline, which reacts with an oxomalonic ester in glacial acetic acid to synthesize 2-carbethoxy-4,5,6-trimethoxyindoxyl, 2-carbethoxy-3,4,5,6-tetramethoxyindole and 4,5,6-trimethoxy-3-hydroxy-3-carbethoxyindole.

Dioxindole

Dioxindole is a non-aromatic heterocyclic organic compound. It has a bicyclic structure consisting of a six-membered aromatic ring fused to a five-membered nitrogen containing ring. It is a hydroxy derivative of oxindole first prepared by reducing isatin with sodium amalgam in an alkaline solution.

See also
Indole
Oxindole

References

Indole forming reactions
Name reactions